Uprun is an airbase of the Russian Air Force located 20 miles north of Troitsk, Chelyabinsk Oblast, Russia.

The base is home to the Aviation Group, 17th Guards Brigade of Army Aviation of the 17th Guards Army Aviation Brigade.

The base has also been used by the 607th Training Aviation Regiment between 1982 and 1998.

References

14th Air and Air Defence Forces Army
Russian Air Force bases